Licenza is a  (municipality) in the Metropolitan City of Rome in the Italian region of Latium, located about  northeast of Rome.

Licenza borders the following municipalities: Mandela, Monteflavio, Percile, Roccagiovine, San Polo dei Cavalieri, Scandriglia.

Main sights

Spring of Bandusia
Orsini castle
 Horace's Villa

References

External links
 Official website

Cities and towns in Lazio